Givat Ela (lit. Ela Hill) is a community settlement in northern Israel. Located near Ilut and Zarzir, it falls under the jurisdiction of Jezreel Valley Regional Council.

History
The village was established in 1988 at the initiative of a gar'in of people from near Haifa.

References

External links
Village website 

Community settlements
Populated places established in 1988
1988 establishments in Israel
Populated places in Northern District (Israel)